In graph theory, the Katz centrality of a node is a measure of centrality in a network. It was introduced by Leo Katz in 1953 and is used to measure the relative degree of influence of an actor (or node) within a social network. Unlike typical centrality measures which consider only the shortest path (the geodesic) between a pair of actors, Katz centrality measures influence by taking into account the total number of walks between a pair of actors.

It is similar to Google's PageRank and to the eigenvector centrality.

Measurement

Katz centrality computes the relative influence of a node within a network by measuring the number of the immediate neighbors (first degree nodes) and also all other nodes in the network that connect to the node under consideration through these immediate neighbors. Connections made with distant neighbors are, however, penalized by an attenuation factor .

For example, in the figure on the right, assume that John's centrality is being measured and that . The weight assigned to each link that connects John with his immediate neighbors Jane and Bob will be . Since Jose connects to John indirectly through Bob, the weight assigned to this connection (composed of two links) will be . Similarly, the weight assigned to the connection between Agneta and John through Aziz and Jane will be  and the weight assigned to the connection between Agneta and John through Diego, Jose and Bob will be .

Mathematical formulation
Let A be the adjacency matrix of a network under consideration. Elements  of A are variables that take a value 1 if a node i is connected to node j and 0 otherwise. The powers of A indicate the presence (or absence) of links between two nodes through intermediaries. For instance, in matrix , if element , it indicates that node 2 and node 12 are connected through some walk of length 3. If  denotes Katz centrality of a node i, then mathematically:

 
The value of the attenuation factor  has to be chosen such that it is smaller than the reciprocal of the absolute value of the largest eigenvalue of A. In this case the following expression can be used to calculate Katz centrality:

Here  is the identity matrix,  is a vector of size n (n is the number of nodes) consisting of ones.  denotes the transposed matrix of A and  denotes matrix inversion of the term .

An extension of this framework allows for the walks to be computed in a dynamical setting. By taking a time dependent series of network adjacency snapshots of the transient edges, the dependency for walks to contribute towards a cumulative effect is presented. The arrow of time is preserved so that the contribution of activity is asymmetric in the direction of information propagation.

Network producing data of the form:

representing the adjacency matrix at each time . Hence,

The form for the dynamic communicability between participating nodes is:

This can be normalized via:

Therefore, centrality measures that quantify how effectively node  can 'broadcast' and 'receive' dynamic messages across the network,

.

Applications
Katz centrality can be used to compute centrality in directed networks such as citation networks and the World Wide Web.

Katz centrality is more suitable in the analysis of directed acyclic graphs where traditionally used measures like eigenvector centrality are rendered useless.

Katz centrality can also be used in estimating the relative status or influence of actors in a social network. The work presented in  shows the case study of applying a dynamic version of the Katz centrality to data from Twitter and focuses on particular brands which have stable discussion leaders. The application allows for a comparison of the methodology with that of human experts in the field and how the results are in agreement with a panel of social media experts.

In neuroscience, it is found that Katz centrality correlates with the relative firing rate of neurons in a neural network. The temporal extension of the Katz centrality is applied to fMRI data obtained from a musical learning experiment in  where data is collected from the subjects before and after the learning process. The results show that the changes to the network structure over the musical exposure created in each session a quantification of the cross communicability that produced clusters in line with the success of learning.

A generalized form of Katz centrality can be used as an intuitive ranking system for sports teams, such as in college football.

References

Graph invariants
Social network analysis